Threlkeld is the surname of:

Caleb Threlkeld (1676–1728), Irish botanist
Dale Threlkeld, American artist
Eleanor Threlkeld (born 1998), English cricketer
Lancelot Threlkeld (1788–1859), English missionary, primarily in Australia
Oscar Threlkeld (born 1994), English footballer
Richard Threlkeld (1937–2012), American television news correspondent

English-language surnames
English toponymic surnames